The 2002 season was the Indianapolis Colts' 50th in the National Football League (NFL) and 19th in Indianapolis. The Colts made it to the playoffs after a one-year absence in 2001 when they finished with a 6–10 record. This was the first of nine consecutive playoff appearances for the Colts. The 2002 season marked the first for the Colts in the newly formed AFC South after competing for 32 seasons in the AFC East. The season is memorable for the team hiring former Tampa Bay Buccaneers coach Tony Dungy. He would later take the Colts to Super Bowl XLI after a successful 2006 season.

In the Wildcard round, the Colts were soundly embarrassed by the New York Jets, as they ended up losing the game 41–0. The Jets would go on to lose to the eventual AFC champion Oakland Raiders the following week.

Offseason

NFL draft

Undrafted free agents

Personnel

Staff

Roster

Preseason

Regular season

Schedule

Game summaries

Week 1: at Jacksonville Jaguars

Week 2: vs. Miami Dolphins

Standings

Postseason

Game summaries

AFC Wild Card Playoff Game: vs. New York Jets

References

External links
 2002 Indianapolis Colts at Pro-Football-Reference.com

Indianapolis Colts seasons
Indianapolis Colts
Colts